HIFK Handboll is the handball section of HIFK who competes in the SM-liiga (men) and SM-sarja (women).

Women's team

Titles

SM-sarja
 Winners (28) : 1946, 1950, 1952, 1956, 1957, 1958, 1959, 1960, 1961, 1962, 1963, 1964, 1967, 1969, 1970, 1972, 1980, 1984, 1996, 2004, 2005, 2006, 2007, 2008, 2010, 2012, 2013, 2014

Finnish Women's Handball Cup
 Winners (12) : 1983, 1984, 2004, 2007, 2008, 2009, 2010, 2011, 2013, 2014, 2015, 2016

European record

Team 

Squad for the 2018–19 season

Goalkeepers
 1  Tia Lehtinen
 12  Roosa Niemi
 22  Ida Vepsäläinen

Wingers
RW
 7  Sara Jäntti
 14  Kathlen Ax
 39  Marinka Miikkulainen
LW 
 3  Anna Vinagradova 
 13  Petra Gostowski
Line Players 
 19  Ida Mitchell
 21  Ella Holopainen
 30  Katarina Felixson

Back players
LB
 18  Linda Cainberg
 23  Anni Kaikko
 26  Ida Väyrynen
CB 
 4  Hanna Nylund
 20  Anniina Nyholm
RB
 8  Inka Jäntti
 11  Annamari Jääskeläinen

References
 Men's team website
 Women's team website
 EHF Club profile

Finnish handball clubs
HIFK